Fernando Oscar Cavalleri Guerrero (8 September 1949 – 3 October 2017) was an Argentine naturalized Chilean football player and manager.

Playing career
Born in Rosario, Argentina, Cavalleri made his professional debut with Morning Star in his city of birth and then played for Gimnasia La Plata from 1965 to 1970, where he coincided with players such as Jorge Spedaletti, Hugo Gatti and Delio Onnis. In 1970 he emigrated to Chile to join Universidad de Chile, but he finally signed with Antofagasta Portuario in the Chilean Primera División.

Managerial career
Cavalleri began his career in his country of birth with Atlético Paraná and Quilmes. Then he returned to Chile where he worked until 2010, with a stint in Venezuela with Deportivo Italchacao in the 1998–99 season, winning the league title. 

He also was the assistant of both Nelson Acosta in Unión Española (1993) and César Vaccia in the Chile national under-20 team (2002–03). He led Chile U20 in the 2003 South American Championship since Vaccia was in charge of Chile at under-17 level.

He stood out as manager of Deportes Concepción by coaching them in 313 matches in total and having won the 1994 Segunda División de Chile.

Personal life
Cavalleri naturalized Chilean by residence in 1980 and made his home in Chile.

In Argentina, he was nicknamed Petete, like a comics character, by their teams, but he was better known as Palito Cavalleri (Thin Stick) due to his thinness.

Cavalleri was the uncle of the professional footballer Matías Cavalleri.

Honours
Deportes Concepción
 Chilean Segunda División: 1994

Deportivo Italchacao
 Venezuelan Primera División: 1998–99

References

External links
 
 Fernando Cavalleri at PlaymakerStats.com

1949 births
2017 deaths
Argentine sportspeople of Italian descent
Footballers from Rosario, Santa Fe
Argentine footballers
Argentine emigrants to Chile
Naturalized citizens of Chile
Chilean footballers
Club de Gimnasia y Esgrima La Plata footballers
C.D. Antofagasta footballers
C.D. Jorge Wilstermann players
Unión San Felipe footballers
Deportes Concepción (Chile) footballers
Club Deportivo Palestino footballers
Club Deportivo Universidad Católica footballers
Everton de Viña del Mar footballers
Lota Schwager footballers
Argentine Primera División players
Chilean Primera División players
Bolivian Primera División players
Primera B de Chile players
Argentine expatriate footballers
Argentine expatriate sportspeople in Chile
Argentine expatriate sportspeople in Bolivia
Expatriate footballers in Chile
Expatriate footballers in Bolivia
Argentine football managers
Chilean football managers
Club Atlético Paraná managers
Quilmes Atlético Club managers
Provincial Osorno managers
Deportes Concepción (Chile) managers
Cobreloa managers
Club Deportivo Palestino managers
Coquimbo Unido managers
Chile national under-20 football team managers
Deportes Puerto Montt managers
Rangers de Talca managers
Primera B de Chile managers
Chilean Primera División managers
Venezuelan Primera División managers
Argentine expatriate football managers
Chilean expatriate football managers
Chilean expatriate sportspeople in Venezuela
Argentine expatriate sportspeople in Venezuela
Expatriate football managers in Venezuela